Nativity! The Musical is a stage musical written and directed by Debbie Isitt (co-composed by Nicky Ager), based on Isitt's 2009 film of the same name (part of the Nativity film series).

The musical follows a Coventry based primary school, St Bernadette's, where teacher Mr Maddens and his assistant, Mr Poppy mount a musical version of the nativity with the students, promising it will be adapted into a Hollywood movie. The musical features songs from the film including "Sparkle and Shine", "Nazareth", "One Night One Moment" and "She's The Brightest Star".

Production history

2017 UK tour 
The musical made its world premiere at the Birmingham Repertory Theatre from 20 October to 12 November 2017, before touring to Southend Cliffs Pavilion (15 to 19 November), Sheffield Lyceum Theatre (22 to 26 November), Manchester Palace Theatre (29 November to 3 December), Plymouth Theatre Royal (6 to 10 December), London's Eventim Apollo (13 to 17 December) and Leeds Grand Theatre (20 December to 6 January 2018) 

The production was directed by Isitt, choreographed by Andrew Wright, with musical arrangements and orchestrations by George Dyer (who is also Musical Supervisor), designed by David Woodhead and produced by Jamie Wilson, Entertainment One, Ramin Sabi, Belgrade Theatre, Coventry and Birmingham Repertory Theatre.

On 2 May 2017, the principal cast was announced including Daniel Boys as Mr Maddens, Sarah Earnshaw as Jennifer Lore and Simon Lipkin as Mr Poppy (who previously appeared as 'Chief Elf' in Nativity 3: Dude Where's My Donkey?!). The X Factor judge Louis Walsh appeared as Hollywood Producer during the production's run at London's Eventim Apollo.

2018 UK tour 
A second tour in the United Kingdom began at the Belgrade Theatre in Coventry (the city where the story is set and the film was shot) from 23 to 28 October 2018. Further tour dates included Liverpool Empire (31 October to 4 November), King's Theatre Glasgow (7 to 11 November), Milton Keynes Theatre (14 to 18 November), Nottingham Theatre Royal (21 to 25 November), Edinburgh Festival Theatre (28 November to 2 December), Regent Theatre Stoke-on-Trent (5 to 8 December) Oxford New Theatre (12 to 15 December) and returning to London's Eventim Apollo (19 to 31 December).

On 7 September 2018, it was announced that Simon Lipkin would reprise his role as Mr Poppy, alongside many other members of the original cast. Scott Garnham and Ashleigh Gray were announced to play Mr Maddens and Jennifer Lore. It was also announced that the role of the Hollywood Producer would vary in each tour location.

Jake Wood appeared in Oxford, Adam Thomas will appear in Stoke and Liverpool, Charlie Brooks appeared in Nottingham, Jane McCarry appeared in Glasgow and Danny Dyer appeared in London. Jo Brand also appeared as The Critic in Edinburgh and London. It was also announced that Dani Dyer, winner of the series of Love Island (2018), appeared during the London dates with her father Danny Dyer as Polly Parker, the daughter of the Hollywood Producer who is an aspiring Hollywood actress.

2019 UK tour 
The musical toured the United Kingdom once again, beginning at the Wolverhampton Grand Theatre from 29 October to 2 November 2019 before touring to Aylesbury Waterside Theatre (6 to 9 November), Cantebury Marlowe Theatre (13 to 17 November), Wales Millennium Centre, Cardiff (19 to 23 November), Plymouth Theatre Royal (26 to 30 November) and Southampton Mayflower Theatre (3 to 7 December) before returning for a third season to London's Eventim Apollo (11 to 29 December).

Scott Paige played Mr Poppy for the tour opposite Scott Garnham and Ashleigh Gray who returned as Mr Maddens and Jennifer Lore, alongside Danni Dyer as Polly Parker who appeared for the tour.

Simon Lipkin reprised his role as Mr Poppy for the London run (and stepped in to cover the role during the Southampton run for Paige due to illness) while Paige played Mr Rye. The London run also featured Rylan Clark-Neal as The Critic, Sharon Osbourne as Crystal Collins and Danny Dyer returning as the Hollywood Producer.

2022 Birmingham 
The musical was announced to return to the Birmingham Repertory Theatre for the Christmas 2020 season. However, due to the COVID-19 pandemic, the run was postponed to the Christmas 2021 season, before being postponed again to Christmas 2022, when it ran from 19 November 2022 to 7 January 2023 starring Ben Lancaster as Mr. Poppy and Billy Roberts as Mr. Maddens. This production also saw the return of Jemma Churchill as Mrs. Bevan who, after appearing in the original and 2018 productions, made a return as she took a year off from the show in 2019.

Cast and characters 

In order to accommodate a variety of star casting, various versions of Nativity! The Musical exist;
Regular version, where the Hollywood Producer's role is minimal. 
Second version, where the Hollywood Producer's role is expanded and includes a daughter, Polly Parker.
Third version, where the Hollywood Producer's role is filled by the character Polly Parker.
Fourth version, where the Hollywood Producer's role is expanded and includes a daughter, Polly Parker and the role of Crystal Collins is created, the CEO of the company the Producer works for.

Musical numbers 

 Act I
 "Overture" – Orchestra, Company and Mr Poppy
 "M.A.D.A - Here Comes Santa Claus / Going For The Big Time" – Mr Maddens, Jennifer, Mr Shakespeare and Company
 "Review" – Critic
 "Five Star Review/Better Than You" – Mr Shakespeare and Oakmoor Kids
 "St Bernadette's" – St Bernadette Kids
 "My Very First Day Of School" – Mr Poppy
 "Wrapped In A Rainbow" – Mr Maddens and Jennifer
 "Hollywood Are Coming" – Mr Poppy, Mrs Bevan, Lord Mayor, St Bernadette Kids and Company
 "Our School Nativity" – Mr Poppy, Mr Maddens and St Bernadette Kids
 "The Lord Mayor's Ball" – Mr Shakespeare, The Critic and Company
 "Dear Father Christmas" – St Bernadette Kids
 "Hollywood We're Coming/Sparkle and Shine" – St Bernadette Kids and Company

 Act II
 "Ent'racte" – Orchestra
 "Welcome To Hollywood" – Jennifer and Company
 "Jennifer's Request" – Jennifer
 "Dear Father Christmas (Reprise) / My Very Last Day at School" – St Bernadette Kids and Mr Poppy
 "Herod The Rock Opera" – Mr Shakespeare and Oakmoor Kids
 "Suddenly" – Mr Maddens and Jennifer
 "Our School Nativity" (Reprise) – Mr Poppy, Mr Maddens and St Bernadette Kids
 "Nazareth" – St Bernadette Kids
 "One Look" – St Bernadette Kids
 "Good News" – St Bernadette Kids
 "Hollywood Never Came" – Mr Shakespeare (2022 production onwards)
 "Sparkle And Shine" – Full Company
 "She's The Brightest Star" – St Bernadette Kids
 "Suddenly" (Reprise) – Mr Maddens and Jennifer
 "One Night, One Moment" – Full Company
 "Sparkle And Shine" – Full Company
 "Bows / Exit Music" – Orchestra

Cast recording 
The original cast recording was released on 29 January 2018 and features 29 tracks. It is available from Amazon, iTunes, Spotify and Apple Music, and was available to purchase from the merchandise stands during the subsequent tours.

Critical reception 
The production received positive reviews from local press in Birmingham, receiving five stars from Plays To See, Behind The Arras, Birmingham Mail and What's On Birmingham

References

External links 
 

2017 musicals
British musicals
Christmas musicals
Musicals based on films